The Anllóns is a Galician river that begins in the Xalo Mountains at an elevation of  above sea level and flows into the Atlantic via the Ria of Corme and Laxe.

Along its  course, it crosses the municipalities of Cabana de Bergantiños, Carballo, Cerceda, Coristanco, and Ponteceso.

It was declared a Site of Community Importance in the year 2001. It is fed by brooks like the Graña, Quenxe, Acheiro, Abaixo, Queo or Bertón during its high course. After the pass at Mount Neme, it receives the water of the brooks Gándara, Bandeira, Vao, Galvar, Portecelo or Batán, and in its low course its tributaries include the brooks Lourido, Ponteceso, Prados and Bouzas.

See also 
 List of rivers of Spain
 Rivers of Galicia

References

Rivers of Spain
Rivers of Galicia (Spain)